Fahad Al-Johani  (born 26 October 1991) is a Saudi professional footballer who plays for Al-Tai as a forward .

References

 

1991 births
Living people
Saudi Arabian footballers
Saudi Arabia youth international footballers
Al Hilal SFC players
Al-Raed FC players
Al-Qadsiah FC players
Al-Fayha FC players
Al Batin FC players
Al-Tai FC players
Saudi Professional League players
Saudi First Division League players
Association football forwards